Wound Creations is the first full-length album of the former death metal band Amoral. It was first released under Rage of Achilles records without the bonus track, then re-released under Spikefarm Records in 2004.

Track listing

2004 albums
Amoral (band) albums